Matteo Gerbaudo (born 10 May 1995) is an Italian football player who plays for  club Mantova.

Club career
He made his Serie B debut for Vicenza on 7 September 2014 in a game against Trapani.

References

External links
 
 

1995 births
Living people
People from Moncalieri
Footballers from Piedmont
Italian footballers
Association football midfielders
Serie B players
Serie C players
Serie D players
Juventus F.C. players
L.R. Vicenza players
S.P.A.L. players
Carrarese Calcio players
Pordenone Calcio players
A.C. Cuneo 1905 players
U.S. Avellino 1912 players
Calcio Foggia 1920 players
Mantova 1911 players
Italy youth international footballers
Sportspeople from the Metropolitan City of Turin